David W. "Davy" Force (July 27, 1849 – June 21, 1918) was a shortstop in Major League Baseball. From 1871 through 1886, he played in the National Association with the Washington Olympics (1871), Troy Haymakers (1872), Baltimore Canaries (1872[end]-1873), Chicago White Stockings (1874) and Philadelphia Athletics (1875), and in the National League for the Philadelphia Athletics (1876), New York Mutuals (1876), St. Louis Brown Stockings (1877), Buffalo Bisons (1879–1885) and Washington Nationals (1886). Force batted and threw right-handed.

The light-hitting but slick-fielding Force is best known for setting off a National Association contract dispute between two teams. The ensuing rulings prompted William Hulbert to begin organizing the National League.

Biography
Force was born on July 27, 1849, in New York City. He played for the semiprofessional New York Mutuals before signing with the Washington Olympics of the National Association. Force played in 15 major-league seasons, and he changed teams nearly every year for the first half of his career. He was known as a "revolver", the term for players who jumped from organization to organization. 

Despite standing out for his lack of size at 5'4" and 130 pounds, he drew some early comparisons to Honus Wagner. He was described as having the body of a large man, only with short and bowed legs. He had modest hitting ability, but he was known as one of the best two infielders in the NL next to Harry Wright.

Baseball author Bill James describes a signing involving Force as one of the factors that prompted the establishment of the National League. After the 1874 season, Force signed with both his 1874 team, the Chicago White Stockings of the National Association, and the Philadelphia Athletics of the same league. It was relatively common that players signed two contracts; a league judiciary committee awarded Force to the White Stockings because he had signed that contract first. However, when a new president from Philadelphia took over the league, he ruled that Force belonged to the Athletics. The reversal contributed to Chicago executive William Hulbert's motivation to organize a new league.

Force posted a .249 career batting average with 653 runs and 373 RBI in 1029 games played. Despite mediocre career numbers, in 1876 Force became the first major-league player to collect six hits in a game.  

Force worked for Otis Elevator Company after his retirement from baseball. His name resurfaced in 1897 when he was briefly wanted for murder in a case of mistaken identity. He died on June 21, 1918, in Englewood, New Jersey, at the age of 68. He was buried there in Brookside Cemetery.

See also
List of Major League Baseball single-game hits leaders

References

External links

Major League Baseball shortstops
Washington Olympics (NABBP) players
Washington Olympics players
Troy Haymakers players
Baltimore Canaries players
Buffalo Bisons (NL) players
Chicago White Stockings players
Philadelphia Athletics (NA) players
Philadelphia Athletics (NL) players
New York Mutuals players
St. Louis Brown Stockings players
Washington Nationals (1886–1889) players
Baseball players from New York City
19th-century baseball players
1849 births
1918 deaths
Minor league baseball managers
Buffalo (minor league baseball) players
Des Moines Hawkeyes players
Memphis Browns players
Sioux City Corn Huskers players
Memphis Grays players
Burials at Brookside Cemetery (Englewood, New Jersey)